Supergirl  is a 1973 Filipino film directed by Howard Petersen. The film stars Pinky Montilla as the titular superhero.

Cast
 Pinky Montilla as Neneng / Supergirl
 Walter Navarro
 Barbara Perez
 Liza Lorena
 Nick Romano
 Ike Lozada
 Mildred Ortega
 Jhoanna Garcia
 Cloyd Robinson
 Odette Khan
 Enrico Villa
 Bernard Calaguas
 Max Rojo
 Cita del Rosario
 Rodin Rodriguez
 Tanay Boys stuntmen

Story
Neneng (Pinky Montilla) together with blind elder sister (Mildred Ortega) and kid brother live in a coastal town frequented by pirates. After invasion of pirates one night which got townfolks' belongings, Neneng was given a ring by a fairy (Barbara Perez). The ring afforded her to transform to Supergirl which enabled her to fly and have superpowers. Meanwhile, a mad scientist (Odette Khan) and her daughter (Djohanna Garcia) settled in the same town with the prospect of bringing back to life dead people including Cesar (Walter Navarro), her daughter's boyfriend. Experimenting first on a dead frog, the scientist thought that her experiment was a failure. But the frog didn't just come back to life, it also grew to an enormous size. The giant frog wreaks havoc on the townsfolk, but Supergirl came to the rescue. Many people died including her blind sister and fiancé (Nick Romano). One time, Cesar came back to life and walked out of the scientist's house and reached Neneng's house. The girlfriend and the mom-scientist followed immediately and made a scene. The townfolks surrounded them and plan to kill both of them but were able to secure themselves in their house. This made the scientist very mad and vowed revenge by bringing back to life the dead people of the town to kill the living. Supergirl was able to stop all of them, including the mad scientist in a duel atop the church.

References

External links

Philippine fantasy action films